The Canon AE-1 Program is a 35 mm single-lens reflex camera that uses Canon's FD mount lenses.  It was introduced in April 1981 as the successor to the Canon AE-1, five years after that camera's introduction.  The major difference was the addition of the Program AE mode first seen in the A-1.  This mode sets both the shutter speed and aperture automatically—albeit with a slight bias towards the shutter speed setting. The user focuses the camera and then presses the shutter button.  For those desiring more control, the AE-1's shutter priority auto-exposure and full manual modes are still available.

Features 
Like the A-1, the AE-1 Program has a right-hand "action grip" on the front of the camera.  It also supports the A-1's Motor Drive MA; this requires another electrical contact on the base plate.  The AE-1's Power Winder A, and a new, faster Power Winder A2, are also supported.  The viewfinder uses LEDs to show information to the user.

Also like the A-1, the AE-1 Program supports interchangeable focusing screens. Unlike the A-1, though, which specifies that screens should only be changed by the factory or by experienced service technicians, those on the AE-1 Program can be changed by the user. The camera came standard with the new split/microprism screen, but seven others were available.  Unfortunately, the AE-1 Program retains the older A-series type electromagnet-controlled cloth-curtain shutter that limits top shutter speed to 1/1000 of a second, together with a rather slow flash sync speed of 1/60 second. In the years since the AE-1 Program was introduced, this shutter design has also proven to be more maintenance-intensive than modern vertical-travel metal blade designs. The camera's electronics and electromagnets are powered by one 4SR44, PX28A, A544, K28A, V34PX, 4LR44, or L544 alkaline batteries.
The focusing screen on the AE-1 Program is brighter than any previous focusing screen on any Canon manual focus camera, allowing the user to focus with greater ease with "slow" lenses (up to f/5.6). It is the same focusing screen design that is used in the newest model of the top-of-the-line Canon F-1 (known as the New F-1).

The additional electronics used for the program features of the AE-1P have resulted in more electronic gremlins over the years, and the model is considered by some more difficult to repair than earlier and simpler A-series cameras.  In its day, however, the AE-1 Program's automated features and simple controls helped introduce many new consumers to the SLR camera.

Gallery

See also
List of Canon cameras

External links 

 The Canon online Camera Museum
 AE-1 Program at Photography in Malaysia.

References 

AE-1 Program